Chil Dahanu (also Romanized as Chīl Dahanū; also known as Chīlābād) is a village in Qaleh Rural District, in the Central District of Manujan County, Kerman Province, Iran. At the 2006 census, its population was 621, in 120 families.

References 

Populated places in Manujan County